I'm Addicted may refer to:

"I'm Addicted", song by Delinquent Habits from Delinquent Habits (album)
"I'm Addicted", song by L.A. Guns from Cocked & Re-Loaded
"I'm Addicted", song by Madonna from MDNA (album)